Agaone amazonica is a species of beetle in the family Cerambycidae. It was described by Bezark, Santos-Silva and Martins in 2011.

References

Rhinotragini
Beetles described in 2011